The second election to Causeway Coast and Glens Borough Council, part of the Northern Ireland local elections on 2 May 2019, returned 40 members to the council via Single Transferable Vote. The Democratic Unionist Party won a plurality of first-preference votes and seats.

Election results

Note: "Votes" are the first preference votes.

The overall turnout was 51.19% with a total of 50,638 valid votes cast. A total of 574 ballots were rejected.

Districts summary

|- class="unsortable" align="centre"
!rowspan=2 align="left"|Ward
! % 
!Cllrs
! %
!Cllrs
! %
!Cllrs
! %
!Cllrs
! %
!Cllrs
! % 
!Cllrs
! % 
!Cllrs
!rowspan=2|TotalCllrs
|- class="unsortable" align="center"
!colspan=2 bgcolor="" | DUP
!colspan=2 bgcolor="" | Sinn Féin
!colspan=2 bgcolor="" | UUP
!colspan=2 bgcolor=""| SDLP
!colspan=2 bgcolor="" | Alliance
!colspan=2 bgcolor="" | PUP
!colspan=2 bgcolor="white"| Others
|-
|align="left"|Ballymoney
|bgcolor="#D46A4C"|34.0
|bgcolor="#D46A4C"|3
|23.5
|2
|22.1
|2
|0.0
|0
|8.4
|0
|0.0
|0
|12.0
|0
|7
|-
|align="left"|Bann
|bgcolor="#D46A4C"|33.9
|bgcolor="#D46A4C"|2
|19.3
|1
|24.2
|1
|9.4
|1
|6.7
|0
|3.5
|0
|3.0
|0
|5
|-
|align="left"|Benbradagh
|12.7
|1
|bgcolor="#008800"|46.1
|bgcolor="#008800"|3
|5.8
|0
|13.1
|1
|4.7
|0
|0.0
|0
|17.5
|0
|5
|-
|align="left"|Causeway
|bgcolor="#D46A4C"|38.3
|bgcolor="#D46A4C"|3
|3.3
|0
|18.8
|2
|6.1
|1
|14.9
|1
|0.0
|0
|18.6
|0
|7
|-
|align="left"|Coleraine
|bgcolor="#D46A4C"|35.6
|bgcolor="#D46A4C"|2
|5.8
|0
|13.0
|1
|13.8
|1
|10.3
|1
|18.6
|1
|2.9
|0
|6
|-
|align="left"|Limavady
|bgcolor="#D46A4C"|45.6
|bgcolor="#D46A4C"|3
|18.6
|1
|7.3
|0
|9.3
|1
|10.0
|0
|0.0
|0
|9.3
|0
|5
|-
|align="left"|The Glens
|12.5
|0
|bgcolor="#008800"|41.4
|bgcolor="#008800"|2
|11.3
|1
|16.0
|1
|0.0
|0
|0.0
|0
|18.8
|1
|5
|-
|- class="unsortable" class="sortbottom" style="background:#C9C9C9"
|align="left"| Total
|30.4
|14
|22.2
|9
|15.3
|7
|9.3
|6
|8.0
|2
|3.1
|1
|11.7
|1
|40
|-
|}

District results

Ballymoney

2014: 3 x DUP, 2 x UUP, 1 x Sinn Fein, 1 x TUV
2019: 3 x DUP, 2 x UUP, 2 x Sinn Fein
2014-2019 Change: Sinn Fein gain from TUV

Bann

2014: 2 x DUP, 2 x UUP, 1 x SDLP
2019: 2 x DUP, 1 x UUP, 1 x SDLP, 1 x Sinn Fein
2014-2019 Change: Sinn Fein gain from UUP

Benbradagh

2014: 3 x Sinn Fein, 1 x SDLP, 1 x TUV
2019: 3 x Sinn Fein, 1 x SDLP, 1 x DUP
2014-2019 Change: DUP gain from TUV

Causeway

2014: 2 x DUP, 2 x UUP, 1 x Alliance, 1 x SDLP, 1 x TUV
2019: 3 x DUP, 2 x UUP, 1 x Alliance, 1 x SDLP
2014-2019 Change: DUP gain from TUV

Coleraine

2014: 2 x DUP, 2 x UUP, 1 x PUP, 1 x SDLP
2019: 2 x DUP, 1 x UUP, 1 x PUP, 1 x SDLP, 1 x Alliance
2014-2019 Change: Alliance gain from UUP

Limavady

2014: 2 x DUP, 1 x Sinn Fein, 1 x SDLP, 1 x UUP
2019: 3 x DUP, 1 x Sinn Fein, 1 x SDLP
2014-2019 Change: DUP gain from UUP

The Glens

2014: 2 x Sinn Fein, 1 x SDLP, 1 x UUP, 1 x Independent
2019: 2 x Sinn Fein, 1 x SDLP, 1 x UUP, 1 x Independent
2014-2019 Change: No change

Changes during the term

† Co-options

‡ Changes in affiliation

– Suspensions
None

Last updated 25 August 2022.

Current composition: see Causeway Coast and Glens Borough Council

Notes

References

2019 Northern Ireland local elections
21st century in County Antrim
21st century in County Londonderry
Elections in County Antrim
Elections in County Londonderry